Ambwene Allen Yessayah (born 5 July 1982), better known by his stage name A.Y., is a Tanzanian bongo flava artist of Makonde heritage. He was born in Mtwara, Mtwara Region, Tanzania. He began his career with the group S.O.G. in 1996. He decided to go solo in 2002. A.Y. is among the first bongo flava artists to commercialize hip hop. He was member of the musical group known as East Coast Army, but now he is no longer part of the group. He is still releasing songs and albums collaborating mostly with a former East Coast Army artist Mwana Fa.

Discography 
Raha Kamili 2003
Hisia Zangu2005
Habari Ndio Hiyo 2008
"Zigo
Habari Ndiyo Hiyo
Kings & Queens Ft. Amani & Jokate 
Microphone Ft. Fid Q 
More & More Ft. Nyashinski 
Touch Me Touch Me Ft. Sean Kingstone & Mis Trinity 
Yule 
Zigo Remix Ft. Diamond Platnumz

Family 
In 2017 A.Y proposed to his long time girlfriend Rehma Remy Munyana at the Golden Tulip in Tanzania.
In 2018, A.Y and Remy got married.
Within the same year 2018, A.Y and his wife welcomed their first Child Aviel Yessayah.

Awards and nominations

Won 

|-
|2007 Tanzania Music Awards
|"Usijarib"
|Best Hip Hop Single
|
|-
|2007 Kisima Music Awards
|Usijarib
|Best Video Tanzania
|
|-
|2008 Tanzania Music Awards
|Habari Ndio Hiyo Ft Mwana Fa
|Collaboration Of The Year
|
|-
|2008 Pearl of Africa Music Awards
|Himself
|Best Tanzanian Male Artist
|
|-
|2010 Tanzania music awards
|Leo Ft Avril (singer)
|Best Reggae Song
|
|-
|2012 Channel O Music Video Awards
|Himself
|Best East African Video
|

Nominations 

|-
|2005 Kora Awards
|
|Best East African Male Artist 
|
|-
|2008 Kisima Music Awards
|Nangoja Ageuke with Mwana Fa
|Tanzanian Video Of The Year 
|
|-
|2008 Kisima Music Awards
|Usiwe Mnali
|East African Collaboration Of The Year Ft Amani (musician)
|
|-
|MTV Africa Music Awards 2009
|Himself
|Best Hip Hop
|
|-
|2009 Channel O Music Video Awards
|Naongea Na Wewe Ft Mwana Fa
|Best African East
|
|-
|2010 Tanzania music awards
|Leo
|Best Music Video
|
|-
|2011 Tanzania Music Awards
|Himself
|Best Male Artist
|
|-
|2011 Tanzania Music Awards
|Usije Mjini Ft Mwana Fa
|Best Hip Hop Song
|
|-
|2011 Tanzania Music Awards
|Dakika Moja Ft Mwana Fa & Hardmad
|Best Collaboration Song
|
|-
|2011 Tanzania Music Awards
|Songa Mbele Ft Alpha Rwirangira
|Best East African Song
|
|-
|2012 Tanzania Music Awards
|Good Look Ft Ms. Triniti
|Best Best Ragga/Dancehall Song
|
|-
|2012 Channel O Music Video Awards
|Speak With Your Body Ft Romeo Miller & La'Myia Good
|Video Of the Year
|

References

External links 

 
 
 
 

Living people
Tanzanian rappers
People from Mtwara Region
1982 births
21st-century Tanzanian male singers
 Swahili-language singers
Tanzanian Bongo Flava musicians